Grace King High School is a public high school located in Metairie, unincorporated Jefferson Parish, Louisiana, United States. It is a part of the Jefferson Parish Public Schools and serves portions of Metairie and Kenner.

Grace King was built in the late 1960s as a high school, opening its doors in 1968 as an all-girls public school serving Jefferson Parish; remaining such until the 1980s, when it became co-ed.

The school, which now serves Grades 9–12, is a part of the Jefferson Parish Public Schools system. The school serves unincorporated portions of Jefferson Parish and a portion of the city of Kenner. The school was named for Grace King (d. 1932), a New Orleans writer and scholar of Louisiana history. The school's mascot is Lucky, the (Fighting Irish) Leprechaun, and the school colors are hunter green, white, and gold.

During Hurricane Katrina in late August 2005, the school suffered damage to its gymnasium's roof, and housed a National Guard troop until the school reopened in October 2005. Grace King High School recently completed building a minigolf course that is accessible to students who are confined to wheelchairs or crutches.

Athletics
Grace King athletic teams participate as a member of the Louisiana High School Athletic Association (LHSAA). The school's athletic teams compete with eight additional teams classified at the Class 5A level, within District 8. 

Starting in the mid-2010s, the school has become known for its soccer program, reaching the state championship match in 2014. The Irish's main rivals are East Jefferson and Bonnabel High School.

Notable alumni

Pantera and Down vocalist Phil Anselmo, fronted the local heavy metal band Razor White. He later was the lead singer for Superjoint Ritual, and current lead guitarist in Arson Anthem.
 Donna Brazile, campaign manager for the Al Gore/Joe Lieberman presidential ticket in 2000, was the first African-American to direct a major presidential campaign.
 Ellen DeGeneres, television show host of The Ellen DeGeneres Show was a brief attendant.
 Trent Giambrone, who made his Major League Baseball debut with the Chicago Cubs on September 29, 2021.
 Danny Granger, former NBA forward for the Indiana Pacers, Los Angeles Clippers, and Miami Heat, was a 2001 graduate as a four-year letterman, averaging 24.3 ppg, 12 rpg and 5.5 bpg as a senior.
 Paul Hollis, member of the Louisiana House of Representatives from St. Tammany Parish, graduated in 1990 from Grace King and served as student body president.
 Salman Khan, founder of the Khan Academy, was valedictorian in 1994.
 Actress Ashton Leigh, who appeared in the TV series Ambitions and NCIS: New Orleans and the miniseries The Act, was a 2004 graduate.
 Michael Lewis ("Beerman"), former San Francisco 49ers and New Orleans Saints wide receiver and kick returner.
 Kevin Mmahat, former MLB player (New York Yankees)
 Mark Mullins, trombonist for Harry Connick, Jr. and Bonerama, is a 1985 graduate.
 Candice Stewart, Miss Louisiana Teen USA in 2002, Miss Louisiana USA in 2005 and a contestant on Big Brother in 2013, is a graduate of the school.

References

External links

Public high schools in Louisiana
Schools in Jefferson Parish, Louisiana
Educational institutions established in 1968
1968 establishments in Louisiana